Ivory Island Lightstation is located 14 miles northwest of Bella Bella on the junction of Seaforth Channel and Milbanke Sound on the Inside Passage of British Columbia.

From 1937 to 1955, the Ivory Island lightstation was part of the British Columbia Shore Station Oceanographic Program, collecting coastal water temperature and salinity measurements for the Department of Fisheries and Oceans everyday for 18 years.

Climate
Ivory Island has a wet and mild oceanic climate. (Cfb)

References

Islands of British Columbia